Diana Johanna Villavicencio Rivera (born November 10, 1985 in Quevedo, Los Ríos) is a judoka from Ecuador.

Bio
Villavicencio was born in Quevedo but she lives in capital city of Ecuador Quito.

When she was 13 her father Colón took her in gymnasium because her older sister Silvia Villavicencio was that time judo champion of Ecuador. First years she was forced to train judo but later due to trainer Daniel Calderón she has enjoyed it. Judo learnt her to be perseverante and disciplined.

She trains almost every day at least 2 hours (before tournament 3h) under Iván Carcañán and Cuban Olympic champion Rafael Carbonell. She is 165 cm tall and she has sometimes problem with weight. She must diet oneself for starting in lightweight category.

Villavicencio is finishing jurisprudence at Universidad Nacional de Loja. She is in last semester (2010).

Her sport dream is starting at Olympic Games in London

Judo
Villavicencio is very experienced judoka and fix star of lightweight category but she is still waiting for a big world tournament. She starts only at 2007 World Judo Championships in Rio de Janeiro where she lost her only match with future Olympic champion Giulia Quintavalle.

Achievements

References

External links
 
 JudoEcuador

1985 births
Living people
People from Quevedo, Ecuador
Ecuadorian female judoka
Judoka at the 2007 Pan American Games
Judoka at the 2011 Pan American Games
Pan American Games bronze medalists for Ecuador
Pan American Games medalists in judo
South American Games silver medalists for Ecuador
South American Games bronze medalists for Ecuador
South American Games medalists in judo
Competitors at the 2002 South American Games
Competitors at the 2006 South American Games
Competitors at the 2010 South American Games
Medalists at the 2007 Pan American Games
21st-century Ecuadorian women